Smolyanskaya is a rural locality (a village) in Khozminskoye Rural Settlement of Velsky District, Arkhangelsk Oblast, Russia. The population was 100 as of 2014.

Geography 
Smolyanskaya is located on the Yelyuga River, 56 km northwest of Velsk (the district's administrative centre) by road. Burtsevskaya is the nearest rural locality.

References 

Rural localities in Velsky District